Disa Västberg (1891-1966) was a Swedish politician (Social Democrat).

She was the daughter of a sawmill-worker and worked as a waitress. In 1911, she married Moje Västberg, editor of the Social Democratic newspaper Nya Samhället of Sundsvall.

She was Chairperson of the Medelpad local branch of Social Democratic Women in Sweden in 1917-1928, and Member of the Sundsvall City Council in 1919. 

She was the editor of Morgonbris in 1936–1952. She was the chairperson of the Social Democratic Women in Sweden in 1936–1952. 

She was MP of the andra kammaren of the Riksdag in 1941–1956.

References

1891 births
1966 deaths
20th-century Swedish politicians
20th-century Swedish women politicians
Swedish social democrats
Swedish feminists